Mikado Glacier is a glacier on the north side of Mahler Spur, flowing west-northwest into Sullivan Glacier near the junction with Gilbert Glacier in northern Alexander Island, Antarctica. The glacier was so named by the UK Antarctic Place-Names Committee in 1977 in association with nearby Gilbert Glacier and Sullivan Glacier, after the 1885 operetta The Mikado.

See also
 List of glaciers in the Antarctic

References

Glaciers of Alexander Island
Gilbert and Sullivan